Birches Head Academy (formerly Birches Head High School) is an 11–16 mixed, secondary school with academy status in Hanley, Stoke-on-Trent, Staffordshire, England. It is part of the Frank Field Education Trust.

References 

{{Schools in Stoke-On-Trent

Secondary schools in Stoke-on-Trent
Academies in Stoke-on-Trent